Ömer Dinçer (born 10 September 1956 in Karaman) is a Turkish politician and academician. Before being a member of the Turkish parliament, he taught at Marmara University for years and published many papers in his field.

He is the architect of 12-year compulsory education system, and has reformed and restructured the primary school and high school curricula as well as educational philosophy.

On 21 October 2005, Council of Higher Education of Turkey (YÖK) identified extensive plagiarism in his academic book Introduction to Business Administration and expelled Dinçer from teaching profession at any university in Turkey. Dinçer appealed the charge, but it was upheld in court.

In the elections of 2007 Dinçer was elected as a member of parliament. On 1 May 2009 he was appointed as Minister of Labor and Social Security in the second cabinet of Erdoğan. On 6 July 2011 he was appointed as Minister of National Education in the third cabinet of Erdoğan. Same year, Council of Higher Education of Turkey had quietly cleared Dinçer to the dismay of many academics. The council confirmed that it had withdrawn the charges, but did not provide any particular reasons.

On 24 January 2013, he was replaced by Nabi Avcı at his post.

References

External links 
  Biography of Ömer Dinçer at the website of AK

Government ministers of Turkey
1956 births
People from Karaman
Living people
Justice and Development Party (Turkey) politicians
Ministers of National Education of Turkey
Atatürk University alumni
Istanbul University alumni
Academic staff of Marmara University
Academic staff of Beykent University
Imam Hatip school alumni
Deputies of Istanbul
Members of the 24th Parliament of Turkey
Members of the 23rd Parliament of Turkey
Members of the 60th government of Turkey